Patricia E. Deegan, Ph.D., is a disability-rights advocate, psychologist and researcher living in the United States.  She has been described as a "national spokesperson for the mental health consumer/survivor movement in the United States." Deegan is known as an advocate of the mental health recovery movement (a cofounder of the National Empowerment Center) and is an international speaker and trainer in the field of mental health.

Deegan co-founded M-POWER (Massachusetts People/Patients Organized for Wellness, Empowerment and Rights) and created CommonGround, “a web application to support shared decision making in the psychopharmacology consultation.”

Personal life
Deegan was diagnosed with schizophrenia as a teenager.  She credits her grandmother with putting her on the road to recovery.

Academia

Deegan received her B.S. from Fitchburg State College in 1977 and her PhD in clinical psychology from Duquesne University in 1984. Her dissertation titled "The use of diazepam in an effort to transform being anxious: An empirical phenomenological investigation" was conducted under the supervision of William F. Fischer. Deegan is a phenomenological psychologist, whose writings include rich autobiographical accounts of her experience living with schizophrenia, and emphasize that recovery from serious mental illness is possible.

As of 2010, she is an adjunct professor at the Dartmouth College Medical School, Department of Community and Family Medicine and the Boston University, Sargent College of Health and Rehabilitation Sciences.

Awards

 2017 International Association of Peer Supporters Steve Harrington Award 
 2015 Wayne Fenton Award for Exceptional Clinical Care
 2013 APA Gold Award: Amplifying the Voices of Individuals Who Use Mental Health Services: A Commitment to Shared Decision Making
 2013 Scattergood Foundation Innovation Award
 2013 New York Association of Psychiatric Rehabilitation Services (NYAPRS) Lifetime Achievement Award
 2010 Patient Empowerment by the Ashoka Changemakers Foundation finalist in the international competition
 2010 Agency for Healthcare Research and Quality recognition as a practice innovation

Representative publications

See also 
Recovery model
Personal medicine
CommonGround

References

External links
Patricia Deegan's Company
Recovery and the Conspiracy of Hope, a lecture by Patricia Deegan
Recovery From Mental Disorders, a lecture by Patricia Deegan

American women psychologists
21st-century American psychologists
Fitchburg State University alumni
American health activists
Duquesne University alumni
Living people
Year of birth missing (living people)
Mental health activists
21st-century American women